Rural Special School District No. 2 was a school district headquartered in Fox in unincorporated Stone County, Arkansas. It operated Rural Special Elementary School (K-6) and Rural Special High School (7-12).

On July 1, 2004, it consolidated with Stone County School District into the existing Mountain View School District.

References

Further reading
These include maps of predecessor districts:
 (Download)

External links
 Rural Special School District No. 2 Stone County, Arkansas General Purpose Financial Statements and Other Reports June 30, 2000

Education in Stone County, Arkansas
School districts disestablished in 2004
2004 disestablishments in Arkansas
Defunct school districts in Arkansas